Victrola may refer to:

Machines
 Victrola, The Victor Talking Machine Company trademark for a brand of wind-up phonograph
 Victrola, a generic name for wind-up phonographs

Titled expressive works
 "Victrola",  a 1982 short story by Wright Morris
 "Victrola" (song), a song by Veruca Salt from their 1994 album American Thighs

Other
 Victrola,  record label RCA Victrola